Rula Halawani (born 1964) is a Palestinian photographer and educator who lives and works in Jerusalem.

She was born in East Jerusalem and received a BA in photography from the University of Saskatchewan and an MA in photographic studies from the University of Westminster. Before turning to visual arts, she worked as a freelance photojournalist for a number of magazines and newspapers. Halawani is director of the photography department at Birzeit University. In 2016, she was given a residency fellowship at the Camargo Foundation, in Cassis.

Her work has appeared in exhibitions in London, in Dubai, in Beirut, at the Khalid Shoman Foundation in Amman, at the Sharjah Biennial, at the National Museum of Women in the Arts, at the Noorderlicht festival, in Rome, at Le Botanique in Brussels, at the Busan Biennale in South Korea and at the Arab World Institute in Paris.

Collections
Halawani's work is held in the following permanent collections:
Centre Georges Pompidou, Paris
Victoria and Albert Museum, London
British Museum, London
Museum of Fine Arts, Houston
Khalid Shoman Foundation, Amman
Nadour Collection, Germany

References 

1964 births
Living people
Palestinian photographers
Palestinian women photographers
University of Saskatchewan alumni
Alumni of the University of Westminster
Academic staff of Birzeit University